Jaan Saul (12 August 1866, in Kuigatsi Parish, Tartu County – 1 February 1954, in Novosibirsk Oblast, Russia) was an Estonian politician. He was a member of I Riigikogu. He was a member of the Riigikogu since 12 April 1921. He replaced Mart Kiirats.

References

1866 births
1954 deaths
Members of the Riigikogu, 1920–1923